Aussie Queer Eye for the Straight Guy is an Australian reality television series that was based on the original and hugely popular American series, Queer Eye for the Straight Guy.

Much like the American version, the program is premised on the stereotype that gay men are superior in matters of fashion, style, personal grooming, interior design and culture. In each episode, a team of five gay men—known collectively as the "Fab Five"—perform a makeover on a subject, usually a straight man, revamping his wardrobe, redecorating his home and offering advice on grooming, lifestyle and food.

However, after the third episode which aired on 23 February, the Network axed the program. The three remaining episodes aired later in the year.

Cast 
 Ryan Andrijich: expert on food, alcohol and beverages, cooking, and meal preparation
 Will Fennell: expert on hair, grooming, personal hygiene, and makeup
 Brendan Wong: expert on interior design and home organization
 Ty Henschke: expert on clothing, fashion and personal styling
 Liston Williams: expert on popular culture, relationships, and social interaction

See also 
 List of programs broadcast by Network Ten
 List of Australian television series

References 

Network 10 original programming
2000s Australian reality television series
Australian LGBT-related television shows
Makeover reality television series
Fashion-themed reality television series
2005 Australian television series debuts
2005 Australian television series endings
2000s LGBT-related reality television series